Laurie Segall (born August 18, 1985) is an American journalist.  Noted for interviewing leaders in technology, including Mark Zuckerberg and Tim Cook, among others,  she was the senior technology correspondent and an editor-at-large for CNN for more than a decade.  Segall also developed and hosted Mostly Human, an investigative docu-series that explored the impact of technology on sex, love, and death.

Biography
Segall was born to a Jewish family in the South although she attended a Christian school, Holy Innocents' Episcopal School. She graduated from the University of Michigan with a BA in political science.  As a student she secured an internship with CNN and was subsequently hired full-time as a news assistant position at CNN.

At CNN, Segall produced several digital short-form series, including “Sex, Drugs & Silicon Valley,” “Revenge Porn,” and “Secret Lives of Superhero Hackers.” She later developed a series that would explore the larger implications of technology, Mostly Human, and successfully pitched the idea to CNN president Jeff Zucker. The six-episode series began airing in March 2017 on CNNgo, and in 2018 won a Webby Award in the documentary series category. In addition to covering technology, Segall has reported on  national breaking news, including the Boston Marathon bombing, and, as a field producer, Hurricane Sandy and Hurricane Irma.  Segall  reconstructed Dzhokhar Tsarnaev’s deleted Instagram account, and tracked down and exclusively interviewed Cleveland kidnapper Ariel Castro's daughter, Angie Gregg.

At 26, Segall appeared on Forbes "30 Under 30" list in the media category. Mashable included her on their list of seven top journalists to subscribe to on Facebook.

In February 2019 she announced that she would leave CNN after more than ten years at the network. She told Variety that she was "leaving to start my next chapter: a venture devoted to the intersection of technology and ethics." In December 2019, Segall launched Dot Dot Dot Media as a content studio.

In March 2021, Segall became a 60 Minutes+ correspondent for the new ViacomCBS streaming service Paramount+.

References

External links

Mostly Humans episodes on CNN Money

CNN people
1985 births
Living people
Jewish American journalists
American women television journalists
University of Michigan College of Literature, Science, and the Arts alumni
21st-century American Jews
21st-century American women